The 2018–19 season is Coventry City's 135th season in their existence, and the club's first season back in League One following promotion from League Two at the end of the 2017–18 season. Along with competing in League One, the club will also compete in the FA Cup, EFL Cup and EFL Trophy.

The season covers the period from 1 July 2018 to 30 June 2019.

Competitions

Preseason friendlies
The Sky Blues will face Sutton United, Everton U23s, Aston Villa U23s, Stevenage, Derby County and West Bromwich Albion, in memory of Cyrille Regis as part of their pre-season preparations.

League One

League table

Results summary

Results by matchday

Matches
On 21 June 2018, the League One fixtures for the forthcoming season were announced.

FA Cup

The first round draw was made live on BBC by former Coventry players Dennis Wise and Dion Dublin on 22 October.

EFL Cup

On 15 June 2018, the draw for the first round was made in Vietnam.

EFL Trophy

On 13 July 2018, the initial group stage draw bar the U21 invited clubs was announced.

Squad information

Squad details

* Player age and appearances/goals for the club as of beginning of 2018–19 season.

Appearances
Correct as of match played on 4 May 2019

Goalscorers
Correct as of match played on 4 May 2019

Assists
Correct as of match played on 4 May 2019

Yellow cards
Correct as of match played on 4 May 2019

Red cards
Correct as of match played on 4 May 2019

Captains
Correct as of match played on 4 May 2019

Suspensions served

Monthly & weekly awards

End-of-season awards

Transfers

Transfers in

Transfers out

Loans in

Loans out

Trials

References

External links
 Official Site
 BBC Sport – Club Stats
 Soccerbase – Results | Squad Stats | Transfers

Coventry City
Coventry City F.C. seasons